King-Cat Comics and Stories is a long-running, critically acclaimed photocopied mini-comic series, authored and self-published by John Porcellino. It is one of the longest continually published mini comics in existence.

Publication history 
Porcellino (under the publisher name Spit and a Half) began producing King-Cat in 1989. (The title of King-Cat comes from the Beat poem "Sometime During Eternity", by Lawrence Ferlinghetti, which Porcellino reprinted in an issue. In the poem, Jesus Christ is referred to as the "king cat".)

Content-wise, King-Cat has evolved considerably over the years: through the mid-1990s, Porcellino's stories were much more angry and humorous, with a punk rock sensibility. A popular, ongoing feature was "Trail Watch", where Porcellino affectionately criticized the various drawing and story peculiarities in the syndicated Mark Trail comic strip. Porcellino also did an entire issue chronicling his (fictional) romantic relationship with Madonna, and did a series of strips following the adventures of "Racky Racoon", a slacker-ish animal who works at a series of dead-end jobs and likes to get drunk. But mixed in with these stories there were always more quiet, melancholy or philosophical stories, and as the years went on these stories increasingly took over the book. (Porcellino developed a strong interest in zen, and he began creating very zen-like stories reflecting on the transient nature of life and sometimes recounting tales of various zen masters or illustrating ancient zen koans.) These stories alienated Porcellino's old fans who had enjoyed the humorous elements of his work, but they won him a new audience.

The active King-Cat letter column title is "Catcalls".

, Porcellino had published 79 issues of King-Cat (an average of three issues per year).

Collections 
La Mano, Zak Sally's publishing venture, released Porcellino's Diary of a Mosquito Abatement Man in 2005, collecting various King-Cat stories about Porcellino's experiences as a pest control worker. The book won the 2005 Outstanding Anthology or Collection Ignatz Award, presented at the 2005 Small Press Expo in Bethesda, MD.

Another collection, Perfect Example, was released in 2005 by Drawn & Quarterly. Perfect Example focused on stories of Porcellino's final days of high school and the following summer in Hoffman Estates, Illinois. Drawn & Quarterly released the 320-page collection King-Cat Classix in 2007. The 2009 collection, Map of My Heart, published by Drawn & Quarterly, collected material from King-Cat in celebration of the title's twentieth anniversary.

Translations of King-Cat Comics have been published in French, German, Spanish, Swedish, Italian, and Korean.

References

External links
 
 Pocellino page at lambiek.net
 2006 Podcast interview with the creator of King-Cat Comics, John Porcellino

American comics titles
Minicomics